The Modewarre Football and Netball Club, nicknamed the Warriors, is an Australian rules football and netball club situated near the rural town of Moriac, Victoria. Modewarre teams currently compete in the Bellarine Football League.

The club, established in 1878, plays its home games at the Mount Moriac Recreation Reserve, Mount Moriac.

Premierships
 Geelong & District Football League (11): 1931, 1938, 1952, 1954, 1960, 1973, 1974, 1976, 1979, 1989, 1994
 Bellarine Football League (1): 2018

Notable VFL/AFL players 
Gary Ablett, Jr. with Geelong and Gold Coast
Nathan Ablett with Geelong and Gold Coast
Ed Curnow with Carlton
Ced Hovey with Geelong
Jim Hovey with Geelong
Ron Hovey with Geelong
John Meesen with Adelaide and Melbourne
 Wayne Carroll

Bibliography
 Cat Country: History of Football in the Geelong Region by John Stoward – Aussie Footy Books, 2008 –

References

External links
 Official website

Bellarine Football League
Australian rules football clubs in Victoria (Australia)
Sports clubs established in 1879
Australian rules football clubs established in 1879
1879 establishments in Australia
Netball teams in Victoria (Australia)